Little Karimun (Karimun Kecil or Pulau Anak in Indonesian) is an island in the Strait of Malacca, about  west of Batam and 35 km south-west of Singapore.  It belongs to the Karimun Regency of the Riau Islands Province of Indonesia. It is located just off the east coast of Sumatra.

Its highest point is 377 m above sea level. It is hilly with fertile soil.

The northern tip of Little Karimun is one of the baseline points that define the legal boundaries of Indonesia.().

Different Areas

Tanjung Balai

See also

 Karimun Jawa, an unrelated archipelago off the north coast of Java

References

Riau Archipelago
Uninhabited islands of Indonesia